Janina Scarlet is a Ukrainian-born American author and clinical psychologist. She is known for incorporating and utilizing popular culture references in treating patients.

Early and personal life
Scarlet was born and raised in Ukraine to a Jewish family. Scarlet and her family endured the Chernobyl disaster. As a child, she was poisoned and had severe migraines and seizures. Anti-Semitism also became prevalent. Her family then decided to secretly move to the US. After a year-long series of examinations, on September 15, 1995, they landed in America.

Scarlet struggled with PTSD. She was also bullied for her origins; for instance, she was taunted as radioactive. A few years later, after watching X-men, she resonated to its character Storm. She was inspired by Storm's similar origins that rather strengthened her as an individual, and it prompted her to reframe her story — from a victim to a survivor. She decided to study psychology to be able to help others who struggled with their past too.

Education and career
Scarlet obtained a master's degree in psychology from Brooklyn College. In 2010, she acquired a doctorate in behavioral neuroscience from Graduate Center, CUNY. She earned a clinical psychology respecialization from Alliant International University and completed her post-doctorate training at Veterans Medical Research Center.

She treated active duty Marines with PTSD via her work at the Veterans Medical Research Center. There, she noticed that many service members identified themselves with superheroes — many stated that they wanted to be Superman but believed that they failed because they developed PTSD. Scarlet once queried a patient whether Superman has vulnerabilities, and he responded Kryptonite; she then inquired whether Kryptonite made Superman any less of a hero, and there was a change of his perspective. It was a life-altering moment that made her apprehend the allegory of incorporating superheroes in treating psychological issues and disorders.

Scarlet worked as a research faculty at Alliant International University from 2011–2017 and as a psychologist at Sharp Memorial Center from 2013–2017. She began working as clinical psychologist at the Center for Stress and Anxiety Management in California in 2012 and is currently the lead trauma specialist there. She specializes in treating anxiety, stress, trauma, and PTSD. Scarlet has also conducted and published psychological analysis of popular films, TV shows, and books.

Scarlet is the recipient of the Eleanor Roosevelt Award for Human Rights by United Nations Association of the United States of America (San Diego Chapter) for her work in mental health education.

Scarlet has been featured as a character in the comic book Seven Days by Gail Simone.

Scarlet worked as a mental health consultant on the fourth season of the HBO Max animated show Young Justice (TV series).

Superhero therapy
Scarlet developed superhero therapy; it is a clinical method of using heroes or popular culture figures and incorporating them into evidence-based therapies to reshape narratives, build rapport, and manage an array of psychological issues. It is reinforced by parasocial interaction which is the connection between a fan and an idol. Scarlet noted a common tendency for patients to not open up — and she utilized stories, whether through films, novels etc. — to encourage free expression thereby gaining insight about the patient's case. Superhero therapy invites clients to consider their own origin stories, as well as to bring up fictional characters as heroic role models to facilitate treatment, as well as to help the clients to become their own version of a superhero in real life. It combines elements of cognitive behavioral therapy and acceptance and commitment therapy. While it is frequently used for treating younger patients, it is as applicable to adults as Superhero Therapy may use personal and nonfictional characters as well.

Works

The Walking Dead Psychology: Psych of the Living Dead (2015)
Star Wars Psychology: Dark Side of the Mind (2015)
Game of Thrones Psychology: The Mind is Dark and Full of Terrors (2016)
Doctor Who Psychology: A Madman with a Box (2016)
Supernatural Psychology: Roads Less Traveled (2017)
Wonder Woman Psychology: Lassoing the Truth (2017)
Superhero Therapy: Mindfulness Skills to Help Teens and Young Adults Deal with Anxiety, Depression, and Trauma (2017)
Harry Potter Therapy: An Unauthorized Self-Help Book from the Restricted Section (2017)
Star Trek Psychology: The Mental Frontier (2017)
Therapy Quest: An Interactive Journey Through Acceptance And Commitment Therapy (2018)
Super-Kids (2019)
Violet and the Trial of Trauma (Dark Agents #1) (2020)
Super-Women (2020)
It Shouldn't Be This Way: Learning to Accept the Things You Just Can't Change (2021)
Superhero Therapy for Anxiety and Trauma (2021)

References

American clinical psychologists
American women psychologists
Ukrainian women psychologists
21st-century American women writers
21st-century Ukrainian women writers
Living people
1983 births
Ukrainian psychologists
21st-century American writers
21st-century Ukrainian writers
Brooklyn College alumni
Alliant International University alumni
Graduate Center, CUNY alumni
Jewish American social scientists
Jewish Ukrainian social scientists